Halina Maria Murias (born 2 April 1955 in Łańcut) is a Polish politician. She was elected to the Sejm on 25 September 2005, getting 6062 votes in 23 Rzeszów district as a candidate from the League of Polish Families list.

She was also a member of Sejm 2001-2005.

See also
Members of Polish Sejm 2005-2007

External links
Halina Murias - parliamentary page - includes declarations of interest, voting record, and transcripts of speeches.

1955 births
Living people
People from Łańcut
Christian National Union politicians
League of Polish Families politicians
Members of the Polish Sejm 2005–2007
Members of the Polish Sejm 2001–2005
Women members of the Sejm of the Republic of Poland
21st-century Polish women politicians